KMDB  may refer to:

Kharkiv Morozov Machine Building Design Bureau
Korean Movie Database or KMDb